Evgeny Bessonov (born 26 November 1968, Rostov-on-Don) is a Russian political figure and a deputy of the 8th State Duma.
 
He served in the military as a platoon commander in the ranks of the Soviet Armed Forces. From 1999 to 2003, he was the assistant to Nikolai Kolomeitsev, who was the deputy of the State Duma. From 2006 to 2013, he was the legal adviser of the Management of mechanization and construction LLC. From 2008 to 2021, he was the deputy of the Legislative Assembly of the Rostov Oblast of the 4th, 5th, 6th convocations. Since September 2021, he has served as deputy of the 8th State Duma.

References
 

 

1968 births
Living people
Communist Party of the Russian Federation members
21st-century Russian politicians
Eighth convocation members of the State Duma (Russian Federation)
Politicians from Rostov-on-Don